The 1992 NCAA Division I women's soccer tournament was the 11th annual single-elimination tournament to determine the national champion of NCAA Division I women's collegiate soccer. The championship game was played at Fetzer Field in Chapel Hill, North Carolina during December 1992.

North Carolina defeated rival Duke in the final, 9–1, to win their tenth national title. Coached by Anson Dorrance, the Tar Heels again finished the season undefeated, 25–0. This would go on to become the seventh of North Carolina's record nine consecutive national titles (1986–1994). It also comprised the Tar Heels' ten-year unbeaten streak that ran from the 1984 final all the way until the 1994 season.

The most outstanding offensive player was Mia Hamm from North Carolina, and the most outstanding defensive player was Sue Wall, from Santa Clara. Hamm was also the tournament's leading scorer (5 goals, 2 assists). An All-tournament team was named for the first time since 1983.

Qualification

All Division I women's soccer programs were eligible to qualify for the tournament. The tournament field remained fixed at 12 teams.

Bracket

All-tournament team
Mia Hamm, North Carolina (most outstanding offensive player)
Angela Kelly, North Carolina
Nancy Kramarz, Hartford
Amy Kroeger, Santa Clara
Jennifer Lewis, Duke
Kristine Lilly, North Carolina
Heidi Mauger, Duke
Meegan McMullin, Duke
Keri Sanchez, North Carolina
Carolyn Springer, North Carolina
Rita Tower, North Carolina
Tisha Venturini, North Carolina
Sue Wall, Santa Clara (most outstanding defensive player)

See also 
 NCAA Division II Women's Soccer Championship
 NCAA Division III Women's Soccer Championship

References

NCAA
NCAA Women's Soccer Championship
 
NCAA Division I Women's Soccer Tournament
NCAA Division I Women's Soccer Tournament
Women's sports in North Carolina